Patrick Watson  (December 23, 1929July 4, 2022) was a Canadian broadcaster, television and radio interviewer and host, author, commentator, actor, television writer, producer, and director for five decades.

Early life
Born on December 23, 1929, in Toronto, Watson attended the University of Toronto and graduated with an MA. He began working on his doctorate at the University of Michigan, but withdrew in 1955 to focus on working for CBC Television.

Career
Watson's first broadcast, in 1943, was as a radio actor in the CBC's children's dramatic series The Kootenay Kid.  He first achieved national fame (and in some quarters, notoriety) as the co-producer and, with Laurier LaPierre, on-camera co-host of the CBC Television current affairs program This Hour Has Seven Days in the mid-1960s. Watson went on to write, edit, and/or produce The Undersea World of Jacques Cousteau, Witness to Yesterday, and Titans. He travelled to the United States for a short stint as anchor and principal interviewer of The 51st State, a local news program televised in 1972–1973 on WNET in New York City. Watson also hosted the CBC's business program Venture when it was first launched in 1985.

In 1983 he created and performed, solo, a stage version of the Old Testament's The Book of Job, at first at the Nathan Cohen Studio in Toronto, directed by John McGreevey, and then at the National Arts Centre Theatre in Ottawa. For CBC he hosted and/or produced The Watson Report and The Canadian Establishment. He also created the Heritage Minutes, The Canadians: Biographies of a Nation, and The Struggle for Democracy series; the last has since aired in over 40 countries around the world. It took five years to make, was filmed in 30 countries and was, at the time, the most expensive original documentary series ever made for Canadian television. The Heritage Minutes were an initiative of Watson's begun in 1988 at Charles Bronfman's CRB Foundation (now The Historica Dominion Institute).

Watson was chairman of the CBC from 1989 until 1994. He was the recipient of honorary Doctor of Laws degrees from Mount Allison University in 2002 and the University of Toronto in 2004. He was invested as an Officer of the Order of Canada in 1981, then promoted to Companion in 2002. Watson continued to write, lecture, advise, and work in many capacities in broadcasting. He was married to Caroline Furey Bamford. Watson has acted in more than 50 dramatic productions, including the movie The Terry Fox Story, and the HBO movie Countdown to Looking Glass.

Personal life
His left leg was amputated above the knee in 1960 due to injuries sustained when he fell from a ladder. He often assisted the Canadian disabled community, including serving as honorary chair of the Canadian Amputee Sports Association and chairman emeritus of the Canadian Abilities Foundation.

He died at his home in Ontario on July 4, 2022.

Selected bibliography

References

External links
 
 Patrick Watson archives at the University of Toronto Media Commons
 

1929 births
2022 deaths
Canadian amputees
Canadian autobiographers
Canadian Broadcasting Corporation people
Canadian non-fiction writers
Canadian Screen Award winning journalists
Canadian television hosts
Canadian television journalists
Canadian television executives
CBC Television people
Companions of the Order of Canada
Journalists from Toronto
Public historians
University of Michigan alumni
University of Toronto alumni
Writers from Toronto